Count Varenne's Lover is a 1921 German silent comedy film directed by Frederic Zelnik and starring Lya Mara, Josef Commer, and Johannes Riemann. It premiered at the Marmorhaus in Berlin on 3 March 1921.

Cast

References

Bibliography

External links

1921 films
Films of the Weimar Republic
German silent feature films
German comedy films
Films directed by Frederic Zelnik
1921 comedy films
German black-and-white films
Silent comedy films
1920s German films
1920s German-language films